The 1955 ICF Canoe Slalom World Championships were held in Tacen, Yugoslavia (now in Slovenia) under the auspices of International Canoe Federation. It was the 4th edition. The Mixed C2 event debuted at these championships.

Medal summary

Men's

Canoe

Kayak

Mixed

Canoe

Women's

Kayak

Medals table

References
Results
International Canoe Federation

Icf Canoe Slalom World Championships, 1955
Icf Canoe Slalom World Championships, 1955
ICF Canoe Slalom World Championships
International sports competitions hosted by Yugoslavia
International sports competitions hosted by Slovenia